Charibert I (517 – December 567) was the Merovingian King of Paris, the second-eldest son of Chlothar I and his first wife Ingund. His elder brother Gunthar died sometime before their father's death. He shared in the partition of the Frankish kingdom that followed his father's death in 561, receiving the old kingdom of Childebert I, with its capital at Paris.

Personal life
Charibert married Ingoberga and they had four children: 
Blithide of Cologne (538-603), possibly married to Ansbertus, Gallo-Roman senator
Chrodobertus (d. 595)
Bertha, who married Æthelberht of Kent

Charibert also had several concubines. By Merofleda, a wool carder's daughter, and her sister Marcovefa, he had daughters: Berteflede (a nun in Tours) and Clothilde (a nun in St. Croix, Poitiers). By Theodogilda (or Theudechild), a cowherd's daughter; Charibert had a son who died in infancy.

Charibert married his daughter Bertha to Æthelberht, the pagan King of Kent. She took  Bishop Liudhard with her as her private confessor. Her influence in the Kentish court was instrumental in the success of St. Augustine of Canterbury's mission in 597, effecting the conversion to Christianity of the first Anglo-Saxon ruler.

Military campaigns and enthronement
In 556, Chlothar sent his sons Charibert and Guntram (his youngest) against their stepmother, "Chunna," and younger stepbrother, "Chramn," who were in revolt. During ongoing negotiations, Chramn was hiding out on Black Mountain in the Limousin. When the negotiations failed, the two armies prepared for battle. However, a thunderstorm prevented any engagement, and Chramn (who was hiding out in Black Mountain) sent forged letters to his brothers (Charibert and Guntram) in which he falsely reported the death of their father (Chlothar). Charibert and Guntram immediately returned to Burgundy to secure their positions.

After the actual death of Chlothar in 561, the Frankish kingdom was divided between his sons in a new configuration (map, left). Each son ruled a distinct realm which was not necessarily geographically coherent but could contain two unconnected regions. Their kingdoms were named after the city from which they ruled. Charibert received Neustria (the region between the Somme and the Loire), Aquitaine, and Novempopulana with Paris as his capital. His other chief cities were Rouen, Tours, Poitiers, Limoges, Bordeaux, Toulouse, Cahors, and Albi. Guntram received Burgundy. Sigebert received Austrasia (including Rheims) with his capital at Metz, and the youngest brother Chilperic received a compact kingdom with Soissons as its capital.

Death and legacy
Though Charibert was eloquent and learned in the law, Gregory of Tours found him one of the most dissolute of the early Merovingians. He maintained four concurrent wives, two of them sisters, and this resulted in his excommunication by Germanus. This was the first ever excommunication of a Merovingian king.  As a result, he was buried in disgrace at Blavia castellum, a stronghold in the Tractatus Armoricani. At his death, his brothers divided his realm between them, agreeing at first to hold Paris in common. His surviving queen (out of four), Theudechild, proposed a marriage with Guntram, though a council held at Paris in 557 had outlawed such matches as incestuous. Guntram decided to house her more safely, though unwillingly, in a nunnery at Arles.

The main source for Charibert's life is Gregory of Tours' History of the Franks (Book IV, 3,16,22,26 and IX, 26), and from the English perspective Bede's Ecclesiastic History of the English People.

References

Further reading
 Bachrach, Bernard S. Merovingian Military Organization, 481–751. Minneapolis: University of Minnesota Press, 1971.
 Historia Francorum Books I-IX at Medieval Sourcebook.

External links

Merovingian kings
510s births
567 deaths
Year of birth uncertain
6th-century Frankish kings
Frankish warriors